The 2001 German Athletics Championships were held at the Gottlieb-Daimler-Stadion in Stuttgart on 29 June – 1 July 2001.

Results

Men

Women

References 
 Results source: 

2001
German Athletics Championships
German Athletics Championships